Pranati  is a Hindu/Sanskrit Indian feminine given name, which means "salutation" or "reverence" . It may refer to:

Pranati Deka , ULFA activist
Pranati Mishra,  Indian athlete
Pranati Rai Prakash, Indian model
Pariva Pranati, Indian actress

References

Indian feminine given names
Hindu given names